The 1936–37 William & Mary Indians men's basketball team represented the College of William & Mary in intercollegiate basketball during the 1936–37 season. Under the third year of head coach Tom Dowler, the team finished the season 0–18, 0–13 in Southern Conference play. This was the 32nd season of the collegiate basketball program at William & Mary, whose nickname is now the Tribe. As of 2019, this has remained William & Mary men's basketball's worst single season record and winning percentage and its only winless season.

After playing as an independent for the previous 31 seasons, this was William & Mary's first season as members of the Southern Conference. They finished in 16th place and did not quality for the 1937 Southern Conference men's basketball tournament in Raleigh, North Carolina.

Schedule

|-
!colspan=9 style="background:#006400; color:#FFD700;"| Regular season

Source

References

William & Mary Tribe men's basketball seasons
William and Mary Indians
William and Mary Indians Men's Basketball Team
William and Mary Indians Men's Basketball Team